The 2017 European 10,000m Cup took place on June 10, 2017. The races were held on RCOP Stadium in Minsk, Belarus.

Medallists

Race results

Men's

Note: Athletes in parentheses did not score for the team result.

Women's

Note: Athletes in parentheses did not score for the team result.

Medal table

Note: Totals include both individual and team medals, with medals in the team competition counting as one medal.

References

External links
 Official website

European Cup 10,000m
European Cup 10,000m
Sports competitions in Minsk
International athletics competitions hosted by Belarus
June 2017 sports events in Europe
European 10,000m Cup